OneAPI may refer to:

 OneAPI (compute acceleration), for different compute accelerator (coprocessor) architectures
 OneAPI (GSM telecom), a set of application programming interfaces